Awang Bulgiba bin Awang Mahmud (Jawi: اوڠ بولڬيب بن اوڠ مهمود) is a Malaysian epidemiologist and physician based at the Faculty of Medicine, University of Malaya.

Biography
Awang Bulgiba is the first Malaysian doctor to be awarded a Doctor of Philosophy (PhD) in Health Information. Prof. Awang Bulgiba is also the first to hold four educational fellowships at the UK Faculty of Public Health, Malaysian Public Health Medicine, the Malaysian Academy of Medicine and the Academy of Sciences. He also holds the position of Secretary-General of the Malaysian Academy of Sciences and President of the Asia-Pacific Public Health Consortium.

During the COVID-19 pandemic in Malaysia, Awang Bulgiba became known on 23 March 2020, by suggesting that the Movement Control Order (MCO) was the best step taken by the government in the fight against COVID-19. He recommended that Malaysia need a minimum of six weeks for the virus containment to work. On April 9, he also said that the MCO should be extended due to the low level of public understanding and compliance of Malaysia in the fight against COVID-19. On April 12, Awang Bulgiba also said that the MCO could be ended if the number of new cases continues to decline and the numbers of recovered exceeds those of new cases.

Award
 
  Glorious Star Commander (PGBK) - Datuk (2017)

References

External links
 Awang Bulgiba Awang Mahmud Profile
 Publication by Awang Bulgiba Awang Mahmud

Living people
Malaysian epidemiologists
Malaysian people of Malay descent
Malaysian Muslims
Year of birth missing (living people)